Polba Assembly constituency was an assembly constituency in Hooghly district in the Indian state of West Bengal.

Overview
As a consequence of the orders of the Delimitation Committee Polba Assembly constituency ceased to exist from 2011.

Members of Legislative Assembly

Election results

1977-2006
In 2006, 2001 and 1996 state assembly elections, Shaktipada Khanra of CPI(M) won the Polba assembly seat defeating Sk. Sahadat Ali of Trinamool Congress in 2006, Azizur Rahman of Trinamool Congress in 2001, and Mainul Haque of Congress in 1996. Brojogopal Neogy of CPI(M) defeated Bhawani Prasad Sinha Roy of Congress in 1991, Tapan Dasgupta of Congress in 1987, Kamal Kumar Mukherjee of Congress in 1982 and Bhabani Prasad Sinha Roy of Congress in 1977.

1967-1972
Bhawani Pd. Sinha Roy of Congress won in 1972. Braja Gopal Neogy of CPI(M) won in 1971 and 1969. B. Chattopadhyay of Congress won in 1967.

References

Former assembly constituencies of West Bengal
Politics of Hooghly district